Leionema montanum,  is a small shrub with terminal clusters of white-pink flowers in upper leaf axils in spring. It is endemic to Tasmania.

Description
Leionema montanum is a small, compact shrub with terete branchlets that grow horizontally along the ground. In between the old leaf bases are lines of star-shaped soft, erect hairs. The upper-side more or less flat, the lower surface smooth and rounded. The dry fruit are rounded at the apex with a short beak. Flowering occurs from November to January.

Taxonomy and naming
This species was first formally described by W.J.Hooker in 1834 and gave it the name Phebalium montanum. In 1998 Paul G. Wilson changed the name to Leionema montanum and the change was published in the journal Nuytsia. The specific epithet (montanum) is derived from the Latin montanus meaning pertaining to a mountain.

Distribution and habitat
This species grows in mountainous situations in north-eastern Tasmania.

References

External links

montanum
Sapindales of Australia
Flora of Tasmania
Taxa named by Paul G. Wilson